Patrick Fillion (born 1973) is a Canadian illustrator and writer of comic books with erotic gay characters and themes.

Born in Quebec, Fillion drew comic book art and nudes from an early age, but when he moved to Vancouver in 1991 and became part of the gay community, his work went from mild to more explicit erotica.  Over time, his style evolved to include more and more risqué subject matter that he developed into a line of self-published comics under the name Class Enterprises.

In 2004, Fillion and his partner Fraz created their own publishing company, Class Comics Inc., through which they release a wider range gay-themed erotic comics.

The exposure of Fillion's characters in Montreal's Zip magazine led to a deal with "mega distributor" Bruno Gmünder, who has released art books featuring Fillion's work entitled Heroes, Mighty Males and Hot Chocolate. The Class Comics titles are translated into German by Gmünder, and into French by France-based publisher H&O Editions.

Fillion also continues to produce illustrations for several gay-themed publications, and has created artwork for numerous events and organizations.

Characters
Fillion's series characters are primarily young, muscled males with improbably large penises. Ethnically diverse, they find themselves in a plethora of dangerous and sexual situations, often involving equally sexualized aliens and supervillains.

Camili-Cat
First appearing in Magma Forces #5 (1986), Camili-Cat is the last of an alien humanoid species that is part feline. "Cam's homeworld was destroyed when he was just a child. Now he roams the galaxy in the hopes of someday finding other survivors of his species."

Naked Justice
Naked Justice is a well-endowed superhero whose costume consists of only boots, long gloves and a mask. He first appeared in 2000's Ecstasy #1, and has appeared in two issues of his own series scripted by former Canadian Male magazine Editor-in-Chief Donald MacLean.

Class Comics: Current editions

Class Enterprises 1992-2003

Translated By H&O Editions (France)

Bruno Gmünder (Germany)
Heroes (Artbook, 2005)
Hot Chocolate (Artbook, 2005)
Mighty Males (English, 2005)
Mighty Males (German, 2005)
iLUSTrations: the Art of Patrick Fillion (Artbook, 2010)
Castle Rain Entertainment
Jestercrow #2 (Cover illustration, 2001)

Mermaid and Avatar Press
Mermaid
GoGo Boy #3 ( Backup 5-page story called "Mermaid Tales" and back cover, 1995)

Avatar
Fillion illustrated a great deal of work for Avatar Press in 2000, 2001 and 2002, some of which has yet to be printed.  The items listed below are the items which have been released to date. 
Avengelyne: Dark Depths #1/2 (Cover, 2001)
Avengelyne: Seraphicide #1/2 (Pax Romana Edition: Cover, 2002)
Hellina #0 (Variant cover, 2003)
Razor: Till I bleed Daylight #1 (Cover art, 2000)
Razor: Bleeding Heart #1 (Inside art, regular cover, 6 variant covers, 2001)
Threshold #26 (Lookers short story part 1 ) – 2000
Threshold #27 (Lookers short story part 1 ) – 2000
Threshold #37 (Adult and regular covers, "The Lookers: the Shaft of Dionysus" Part 1, 2000)
Threshold #38 (Adult and regular covers, "The Lookers: the Shaft of Dionysus" Part 2, 2000)
Twilight Raw #1 (Covers and additional inside art, 2000)
Twilight Raw #2 (Covers and additional inside art, 2000)

Magazines
All-Man Magazine (Various monthly illustrations, 2002–2004)
Black Inches magazine (Various monthly illustrations, 2002 – present)
Latin Inches magazine (Various monthly illustrations, 2002–present)
Handjobs magazine – (Short story illustrations, January 2002)
Freshmen magazine (Various monthly illustrations, 2005–present)
Inches magazine (Various monthly illustrations, 2006–present)
Torso magazine (Various monthly illustrations, 2006–present)
Zip magazine - April/May 1999 (French version of "Camili-Cat: Auto Pilot")
Zip magazine - June/July 1999 (French version of "Camili-Cat: Poor Kitty Cat")
Zip magazine - Aug/Sept 1999 (French version of "Camili-Cat: Reunion")
Zip magazine - Oct/Nov 1999 (French version of "Camili-Cat: the Djinns")
Zip magazine - Winter 1999 (Cover illustration - Interview with Patrick Fillion)
Zip magazine - Winter 2000 (Cover illustration - French version of "Naked Justice")
Zip magazine - Winter 2001 (Cover illustration – Patrick Fillion art gallery)
Zip magazine - Spring 2001 (French version of "Dane and the Leathermen")
Zip magazine - Fall 2001 (French version of "Naked Justice: Orgy of the Damned")
Zip magazine - Winter 2002 (Interview with Patrick Fillion – Art Gallery)

Anthologies
Meatmen #25 ("Camili-Cat vs. the Djinns," 10-page short story, 2002); Leyland Publications
What's Wrong (Cover illustration and 4 Camili-Cat strips, 2002); Arsenal Pulp Press

Calendars
 Hot Chocolate - 2007 Calendar

References and notes

External links
 PatrickFillion.com
 Character bios - PatricFillion.com
 ClassComics.com
 Patrick Fillion blog - Boytoons.blogspot.com
 Patrick Fillion interview - BananaGuide.com
 Patrick Fillion at Bruno Gmuender

1973 births
Canadian cartoonists
French Quebecers
Canadian gay writers
LGBT comics creators
Canadian gay artists
Living people